(born 1961), French journalist, businessman and politician.
 Robert Miguet (born 1929), French civil servant (prefect).